The 1989 Women's African Volleyball Championship was the Fourth Edition African continental volleyball Championship for women in Africa and it was held in Port Louis, Mauritius, with Fourth teams participated.

Teams

Final ranking

References

1989 Women
African championship, Women
Women's African Volleyball Championship